Vincent de Pio (born March 20, 1979) is a Filipino artist who graduated from the University of the Philippines School of Fine Arts majoring in Painting. He is the fourth child of the renowned artist and professor, Gig de Pio, and his siblings are Simkin, Gig Jr., Domino, and Julian de Pio. He was raised earlier on in his life already exposed to different art techniques and styles, learning about anatomy and how to draw. Inspired by Expressionism, he subjects of his work range from landscapes to portraits to more figurative works.

Captivated and inspired by classical music, his first solo show was composed of several paintings of a woman playing a cello. Later on, his choice of subject are characters of Japanese culture, as he is fascinated with their intricacies. De Pio seeks to portray social politics as well as his own story through his paintings. His artist influences include his late uncle Vicente Manansala, and the more contemporary artist, Kent Williams. Also inspired by Juan Luna and Arturo R. Luz, de Pio counts Impressionism and Cubism as artistic movements that inspire him, although his own work tends to combine expressionist and realist techniques.

His works have been critically and commercially acclaimed, garnering attention in exhibits located in Manila and Singapore.

He has participated in over 20 group exhibits and three exhibits wherein the theme was for the artists to create their own portrayal of the woman of today. He has also been a finalist for competitions such as that in UP College of Fine Arts, the Metrobank Art Competition and the GSIS National Art Competition.
De Pio is one of the artist members of Galerie Joaquin, where he had his debut solo exhibition.

"Quiet Fortissimos" (2009) 

"Quiet Fortissimos" was Vincent de Pio's first solo show which ran from January 30, 2009 to February 13, 2009. It was located in Galerie Joaquin in San Juan, Metro Manila.

The show's title refers to the dynamics of de Pio's works and the variations he introduces in each piece. Like the changing loudness in a piece of music, each artwork bears witness to the changes in the artist's moods. When he is no longer content with a technique, de Pio switches to another.

In 2005, de Pio was among the artists invited to exhibit at fundraising concerts held in memory of the late cellist Tiking Lopez. One of the guest performers was Ena Song, a visiting Korean cellist. Drawn to her beauty, de Pio immediately imagined how he wanted to approach his paintings the first time he saw her. Song who did not speak fluent English, became his mysterious muse, inspiring several paintings even after years since their first meeting. This had later composed most of what became his first solo exhibit.

Achievements

Auctions

Book Publications

Major Exhibitions

References

External links 
(http://www.galeriejoaquin.com/artists_profile.asp?ar_name=Vincent%20de%20Pio)
(http://www.galeriejoaquin.com/exhibit_profile.asp?ex_title=Quiet%20Fortissimos)

1979 births
Living people
Filipino painters
Artists from Metro Manila